The Mutzenberg is a 770.0 m high (above sea level) mountain located in the Thuringian Highland, Thuringia (Germany). 

It is to be found close to the municipality of Lichte, and the Leibis-Lichte Dam in the  Saalfeld-Rudolstadt district in the Thuringian Forest Nature Park. The section of the Rennsteig walkway between Neuhaus am Rennweg, Piesau, and Spechtsbrunn runs close to the mountain.

See also
 List of Mountains and Elevations of Thuringia

Mountains of Thuringia
Thuringian Forest
Lichte